Travail, Genre et Sociétés (English: Work, gender and societies) is a biannual French language peer-reviewed academic journal which studies the differences between men and women in the workplace and, more broadly, the role of women in society. The editor-in-chief is Margaret Maruani (CNRS and Paris Descartes University).

Abstracting and indexing 
The journal is abstracted and indexed in the Social Sciences Citation Index and Scopus.

See also 
 List of women's studies journals

References

External links 
 

Biannual journals
English-language journals
Feminist journals
French-language journals
Labour journals
Publications established in 1999
Women's studies journals
Multilingual journals
Feminism in France